The Spook Speaks is a 1940 film directed by Jules White. It is the sixth short subject starring Buster Keaton made for Columbia Pictures.

Plot
Buster and his wife Elsie Ames are temps sent to a house owned by a spiritualist/magician Professor Mordini (Lynton Brent), where they are to act as caretakers. Mordini leaves on a vacation and warns the couple not to let his former assistant in the house to steal his secrets. Spooky gags follow, along with a penguin on roller skates. A newlywed couple arrives (Dorothy Appleby and Don Beddoe), and the wife is fascinated by spiritualism. Mordini's vengeful former assistant Bruce Bennett breaks into the house and finds Mordini's master controls, scaring everyone out of the house at last.

Cast
 Buster Keaton as the caretaker
 Elsie Ames as his wife
 Lynton Brent as Professor Mordini
 Dorothy Appleby as the newlywed wife
 Don Beddoe as the newlywed husband
 Bruce Bennett as the former assistant
 Orson the penguin

See also
 Buster Keaton filmography

External links

 The Spook Speaks at the International Buster Keaton Society

References

1940 films
1940 comedy films
Columbia Pictures short films
American black-and-white films
Films directed by Jules White
American comedy short films
1940s English-language films
1940s American films